Slime Time Live is a television show that aired on Nickelodeon from 2000–2004, lasting 8 seasons. During its run it was hosted by Dave Aizer, Jonah Travick and Jessica Holmes and produced/directed by Jason Harper. It was located outside (inside if either weather did not permit, or the outdoor area had become too messy from earlier in the day) of the former Nickelodeon Studios at Universal Studios Florida (the third-to-last show to do so). It mainly aired as filler during regular commercial time.

The show holds two Guinness World Records – most people pied in three minutes (1,000 in 2001), and most people slimed (762 on the finale). The sliming was done outdoors, in front of the studios.

Sliming
The show was known to have slimed their audience; when they did this they would pick someone, sit them in a chair, and ask them a question. If they answered correctly, they would get a bucket of slime (eventually changed to two buckets, then three) poured on top of them.

Pieing
The show was also known to have their audience members, contestants, hosts, celebrity guests, and staff caught on-camera pied in the face. When it was cancelled, Nick's pieing trademark was forgotten. It was later revived through the Nick-themed resort and cruise line.

Interactive games
During the show, viewers would phone in to play interactive games with players on the show. The most common game was to make a match of Nicktoons from off of a Tic-tac-toe grid. The board was scrambled before game play and if a match was made, the home player would win a prize and the contestant would be slimed and often pied as well. If they did not make a match, host Dave Aizer would receive a whipped cream pie in the face. Later when the mystery bucket was introduced, if no match was made, only the mystery bucket would drop on the player. In addition to Nicktoons, the board included a pie tile (the contestant would shove the pie they are holding in their face), a "cream blaster" tile (where the contestant would be blasted with whipped cream by the two side cannons), a bonus tile (where the home player gets another try) and an "instant slime" tile or a wild card (which triggered an automatic match, an instant sliming and an instant win). On some occasions, an overload of slime is used. And slime-u-lator 2.0 where they have to hand pedal and slime in the red blue bins can travel upward through the yellow tubes into those two bins and filling the plastic tubes with slime and one bins with high point will fall down to which team and which team gets slime from one those bins is filled they will win and move on to big shaboozie showdown round.

More interactive games would be played as the run progressed. Many celebrities from other Nick shows appeared often.

The Big Shaboozie
First known as "Super Sloppy Slime-Off," The Big Shaboozie was the show's end game. Below are changes made, over the years, to it while the show was on-air.

2000/01
In "Super Sloppy Slime-Off," two out of three teams (each team had three contestants), Jessica led one team and Jonah led the other, would stand under a trough filled with slime. Dave would ask a Nick-related question, if one of the in-house players answered the question, one of the contestants from the home player's team would be pied by their team leader, if they answered wrong, a contestant from the opposing team would be pied by their team leader. The team to have all three of their members pied would be slimed and (along with the home player) receive a grand prize.

2002
Renamed "The Big Shaboozie," changes to the game included Dave asking Nick-related questions on the given topic (instead of random questions); all players would now wear goggles during the game—whether it was getting pied, slimed, etc. --  in addition to getting slimed (they often got slimed with other substances besides that), the members of the winning team would be blasted (front and back) with whipped cream.

Changes unrelated to the game
 The logo has been changed.
 An audience member would introduce the game.

2003
This time, there are only two players on each team. Each team takes turns deciding which number to pick on a Tic-Tac-Toe board, if one team finds "The Big Shaboozie" they will win the game, but if they find "The Whammy," the opposing team wins.

Changes unrelated to the game
 The logo has been changed.
 An audience member introducing the game would be pied.

Celebrity guests on Slime Time Live
 Aaron Carter
 A-Teens
 Jason Harris
 The Spy Kids (Alexa PenaVega and Daryl Sabara)
 LFO
 Michelle Branch
 Anthony Anderson
 Gary Dell'Abate
 Mick Foley
 Nick Cannon
 David Lynch
 Frankie Muniz
 Lil Romeo
 Dana Carvey
 David Arquette
 Christina Vidal
 Lil Bow Wow
 Jason Acuña
 Randy Savage
 Lemony Snicket
 Billy Gilman
 3LW
 Dream
 Lance Bass
 Chris Kirkpatrick
 Jump5
 American Juniors
 No Secrets
 Dream Street
 Play
 Tom Kenny (As Patchy the Pirate)

Final season
For the final season, the show began recording prior to the days it was set to air, and aired in the morning hours. Nickelodeon had tried to gain young viewers in that time through this, but ratings declined shortly thereafter. The show would often "connect" (Florida to New York) with U-Pick Live, which would replace it later in the year.

On the grand finale, the show broke the world record for most people slimed at one time.

Friday Night Slimetime
One year after the show's cancellation, Friday Night Slimetime premiered on Nickelodeon, but unlike the original version, its segments were prerecorded. It lasted for two back to back seasons and was hosted by Lil' JJ and Chloe Dolandis (who had previously hosted Splat! on Nickelodeon). Nickelodeon had a talent hold on Lil' JJ and was forced to give him a show to finish out his contract. Because of this, Dave Aizer was brought on board as a writer and also occasionally announced the prizes. The most common prizes on it were either a bicycle or athletic balls. This ran from September 23, 2005 to March 24, 2006.

References

External links
 

Nickelodeon game shows
2000s American children's game shows
2000s Nickelodeon original programming
2000 American television series debuts
2004 American television series endings
Interactive television